Robert James Borrie (December 31, 1926 – December 26, 1999) was a Canadian politician, manager and secretary. He was elected to the House of Commons of Canada in the 1968 election as a Member of the Liberal Party to represent the riding of Prince George—Peace River. He was a member of the House of Commons Standing Committee on Agriculture. He was defeated in the 1972 election. Prior to his federal political experience, he served in the Canadian Army as a Corporal in 1945.

References
 

1926 births
1999 deaths
Liberal Party of Canada MPs
Members of the House of Commons of Canada from British Columbia
People from Cobalt, Ontario